Ahuvia Kahane is a British academic working in Ireland, specializing in the study of Greek and Roman antiquity, its traditions and the relations between the ancient world and modern culture and thought. Kahane is the 17th Regius Professor of Greek at Dublin, the A. G. Leventis Professor of Greek Culture (2017) and Fellow of Trinity College Dublin.   He is also Senior Associate at the Oxford Centre for Hebrew and Jewish Studies at the University of Oxford.

Scholarly work

Kahane's work addresses questions of form and content, continuity and change, authority and the ethics of literary reflection. He has made contributions to the study of Greco-Roman antiquity and early Greek epic, orality and oral traditions, literary history, modern poetry and poetics, visual culture and modern art, Hebrew studies, lexicography, sociology and anthropology, translation and translation studies.

Early and personal life
Ahuvia Kahane was born on an agricultural commune (kibbutz), Ramat Yohanan in the north of Israel to Reuven Kahane (1931-2003), a professor of sociology, Fellow of the Harry S. Truman Research Institute for the Advancement of Peace and Saul Robinson Chair at the Hebrew University in Jerusalem and Orna, née Smirin, an artist and editor who, following a divorce, married Magnum Photos photographer Micha Bar-Am. Kahane's grandparents were among the founders of the kibbutzim movement and of Beit Alpha and Kineret in northern Israel. His paternal grandfather, David Kahane, served in Ben Gurion's government. In 1960, Ahuvia Kahane left the kibbutz with his father, who had remarried the educator Israela, née Shochat. He attended Rehavia school in Jerusalmen and Cornell School in Berkeley, California. As a teenager, Kahane was a member of Mazpen (‘Compass’) a socialist, anti-Zionist organization that had splintered from the Israeli Communist Party. Kahane left Israel in 1984. He married Georgina Calvert-Lee, a barrister, in 1992. They have three children, Berenike, Erasmus and Lysander. Kahane is a Freeman of the City of Durham, England.

Academic career
Kahane studied Greek and Latin in the Department of Classics at the University of Tel-Aviv, working with linguist , John Glucker and other scholars and obtaining a B.A. in 1983. As an undergraduate he was commissioned by Jerusalem publishers Keter to translate Homer's epics from Greek to Hebrew (though publication was much delayed, Keter 1996). Kahane completed his D.Phil. at Balliol College, Oxford (1990 supervised by Jasper Griffin), where, between 1987 and 1990 he was also sometime Lecturer in Classics. During this period Kahane also became associated with the Oxford Centre for Hebrew and Jewish Studies and began work with N. S. Doniach, OBE and a team of lexicographers at Oxford University Press on the Oxford English-Hebrew Dictionary, a project which he co-edited with Doniach and brought to completion shortly after Doniach's death in 1996.

In 1990 Kahane became a Junior Research Fellow at St. Cross College, Oxford and at the Oxford Centre for Hebrew and Jewish Studies and in 1993 a Junior Fellow at Harvard University's Center for Hellenic Studies. In 1994 he was appointed Assistant Professor of Classics at Northwestern University where he was tenured as Associate Professor (2000) and later (2003) appointed Chairman of the Department of Classics. During this period Kahane maintained an appointment as Senior Associate at the Centre for Hebrew Studies in Oxford. He co-founded (1998, with S. Sara Monoson) the Classical Traditions Initiative at Northwestern and worked closely with the Alice Kaplan Institute for the Humanities.
In 2004 Kahane took up the appointment of Professor of Classics at Royal Holloway, University of London, where he was also associate director of the University of London Institute in Paris (2006-8), Director of the Humanities and Arts Research Institute (2005–11), Head of the Classics Department (2012-2015) and co-director of the Centre for the Reception of Greece and Rome (2007–19). Kahane was appointed Regius Professor of Greek (1761) and A. G. Leventis Professor of Greek Culture in 2019 and was made a Fellow of Trinity College Dublin in 2020.

Publications
The Gods in Greek Hexameter Poetry and Beyond (edited with J. Clauss and M. Cuypers)  (2016) Stuttgart: F. Steiner Verlag. ISBN 
Homer: Guide for the Perplexed (2012) London: Continuum/Bloomsbury. 
Social Order and Informal Codes (in Hebrew), with T. Rappoport, (2012) Jerusalem: Resling Publishers.
Antiquity and the Ruin Revue européenne d'histoire Vol. 18.5-6 (2011), (special double-issue). 
Diachronic Dialogues: Continuity and Authority in Homer and the Homeric Tradition in series "Greek Studies, Interdisciplinary Approaches" (2005), (Lanham, MD: Rowman and Littlefield.
A Companion to the Prologue to Apuleius’ Metamorphoses (edited with A. J. W. Laird) (2001) Oxford: Oxford University Press.
The Chicago Homer with M. Mueller, C. Berry W. Parod (2000) Evanston, IL: Northwestern University. 
Written Voices, Spoken Signs: Tradition, Performance and the Epic Text (edited with E. J. Bakker) (1997) (Cambridge, MA: Harvard University Press. 
The Oxford English Hebrew Dictionary (edited with N. S. Doniach) (1996) (Oxford: Oxford University Press.
Homer: Odyssey (in Hebrew) (1996) (Jerusalem: Keter Publishers). 
The Interpretation of Order: A Study in the Poetics of Homeric Repetition (1994) (Oxford: Oxford University Press 9780198140771.

References

External links
The Chicago Homer, website of the Chicago Homer project
Ancient Culture Lab: Homer's Experience and the Greek Language, Trinity Elective
Heroic Fate and Homer's Iliad, The Academy of Ideas
The Jewish Ruin, British Museum, 1 March 2011
Order and Chaos. A Conference at the Hebrew University, June 23, 2012.

Living people
British classical scholars
Fellows of Trinity College Dublin
Israeli emigrants to the United Kingdom
1957 births
Tel Aviv University alumni
Alumni of Balliol College, Oxford
Northwestern University faculty